Alma Dawson is an American scholar of librarianship. She retired as Russell B. Long Professor at the School of Library & Information Science, Louisiana State University in 2014 and was awarded Emeritus status in 2015. In 2019 Dr. Dawson was honored with the Essae Martha Culver Distinguished Service Award from the Louisiana Library Association which honors a librarian whose professional service and achievements, whose leadership in Louisiana association work, and whose lifetime accomplishments in a field of librarianship within the state merit recognition of particular value to Louisiana librarianship.

Dawson earned the B.S. degree from Grambling State University in secondary education and taught in the Natchitoches Parish School System. She earned the master's degree in library and information science from the University of Michigan in Ann Arbor.  She then worked as a librarian at Prairie View A&M University.  In  1982 she joined the Louisiana State University Libraries faculty as the library and information science librarian.
  
She earned the  PhD in Library Science and Higher Education from the Texas Woman's University in 1996 and joined the faculty of the School of Library and Information Science at Louisiana State University where she was promoted through the academic ranks to the named professorship: Russell B. Long Professor.

Project Recovery

Dawson was awarded a grant from the Institute of Museum and Library Services in 2009 titled “Project Recovery."  Students recruited under this initiative received IMLS-funded scholarships to earn master's degrees in librarianship.  As part of their education and early-career development, the students participated in projects identified by partner libraries affected by Hurricane Katrina and Hurricane Rita.

Publications
"Educating the Next Generation of Librarians for South Louisiana Libraries: Project Recovery Scholars Tell Their Stories." Louisiana Libraries 75 (Fall 2012).
"Preserving memories, community, and restoring hope: Katrina and Haiti: Experiences after the disasters." Acuril Xli: Proceedings from the Annual Conference : the Role of Libraries and Archives in Disaster Preparedness, Response, and Research. Tampa, Fla: Association of Caribbean University, Research and Institutional Libraries (ACURIL), 2011.
“Rebuilding Community in Louisiana after the Hurricanes of 2005.”   Reference and User Services Quarterly. 46 (Summer 2006): 292–296.  
The African-American Reader’s Advisor: A Guide for Readers, Librarians, and Educators. Edited by Alma Dawson and Connie Van Fleet.  Englewood, Colorado: Greenwood Publishing Group, 2004.
A History of the Louisiana Library Association.  Edited by Alma Dawson and Florence Jumonville. Baton Rouge: The Louisiana Library Association, 2003. 
Celebrating African American Librarians and Librarianship. Library Trends, 49.1  (Summer 2000): 49–87.
"A Marriage Made in Heaven or a Blind Date: Successful Library-Faculty Partnering in Distance Education". with Dana Watson. Catholic Library World. 70(September 1999): 14–22.
Dawson, Alma. Report on the Survey of Library Science Collections. ACRL Discussion Group of Library Science Librarians, 1990.
Development of a Core Library Collection for Library Automation: Report to the Council on Library Resources on Project CLR #4026-B. Baton Rouge, LA: Research Center Annex, School of Library and Information Science, Louisiana State University, 1989.

Recognition

2005 recipient of the American Library Association Equality Award, which recognizes contributions for promoting equality in the library profession.
2012 Louisiana Library Association's Meritorious Service Award  The Award honors a librarian who has demonstrated sustained and exemplary leadership and service to further the development services and visibility of the Louisiana Library Association. 
2013 Advocate for Diversity Award-Louisiana State University, College of Human Sciences and Education.
2015 Emeritus Professor at Louisiana State University.
2019 Louisiana Library Association. Essae Martha Culver Award.

References

African-American librarians
American librarians
Grambling State University alumni
Louisiana State University faculty
University of Michigan School of Information alumni
Texas Woman's University alumni
Living people
Place of birth missing (living people)
Year of birth missing (living people)
American bibliographers
American women librarians
Women bibliographers
American women academics
21st-century African-American people
21st-century African-American women